Leo Bradshaw (April 1880 – 29 June 1945) was a South African cricketer. He played in one first-class match for Border in 1906/07.

See also
 List of Border representative cricketers

References

External links
 

1880 births
1945 deaths
South African cricketers
Border cricketers